Uwe Peschel (born 4 November 1968) is a German former professional road bicycle racer and a time trialist. 

Peschel was born in Berlin in 1968. His father, Axel Peschel, had represented East Germany at the 1968 Olympic men's team time trial a fortnight prior to his birth. At the 1992 Summer Olympics, Peschel Jr along with Bernd Dittert, Christian Meyer and Michael Rich, won the gold medal in the men's team time trial.

Major achievements 

1992
 Gold Medal, Men's Team Road Race – Summer Olympics
1996
 Bayern-Rundfahrt
1997 – 
 Grand Prix des Nations (ITT)
 Stage 3b (ITT) – Danmark Rundt (2.3)
 Stage 3 (ITT) – Regio-Tour (2.4)
 Stage 4b (ITT) – Grand Prix Tell
1998 – Estepona en Marcha – Brepac
 Stage 4b (ITT) – Trofeo Castilla y Leon (2.4)
 3rd, Stage 9 (ITT) – Vuelta a España
1999 – Gerolsteiner
2001 – Gerolsteiner
 Stage 1 – Peace Race (2.3)
2002 – Gerolsteiner
 Grand Prix des Nations (ITT) (1.1)
  National Time Trial Cycling Championship
 1st overall and Stage 4b (ITT) win – Hessen Rundfahrt (2.3)
 Karlsruhe Versicherungs GP (with Michael Rich) (1.2)
 9th overall – Deutschland Tour (2.2)
 9th overall – Peace Race (2.2)
2003 – Gerolsteiner
 GP Eddy Merckx (with Michael Rich)
 2nd (Silver Medal) – World Time Trial Cycling Championship
2004 – Gerolsteiner
2005 – Gerolsteiner
 3rd – Luk Challenge (1.1) (with Michael Rich)
 4th, Prologue (ITT) – Eneco Tour

References

External links

1968 births
Living people
German male cyclists
Cyclists at the 1992 Summer Olympics
Cyclists at the 1996 Summer Olympics
Olympic cyclists of Germany
Olympic gold medalists for Germany
Cyclists from Berlin
Olympic medalists in cycling
Medalists at the 1992 Summer Olympics